Hans Ferdinand Emil Julius Stichel (16 February 1862 – 2 October 1936, in Berlin) was a German entomologist who specialised in Lepidoptera.

Stichel was born in Wronke, Prussian Province of Posen (Wronki, Poland) and attended the Royal Realgymnasium of Berlin. In May 1882, he started to study philosophy at the Friedrich-Wilhelm University Berlin. After the death of his father he had to stop his studies in 1883 for financial reasons. Stichel then began a career as a railway civil servant becoming director of railway materials first class in 1893. In 1921, he became a higher inspector and in 1922 Director of the office in Berlin.

From 1892, he devoted his spare time to the publication of entomological reviews. From 1912 to 1923, he directed the publication of Zeitschrift für wissenschaftliche Insektenbiologie (Journal of scientific insect biology) and Neuen Beiträge zur systematischen Insektenkunde (New posts on systematic entomology). He was also the author of more than one hundred publications on insects, mainly butterflies. Stichel moreover took part in collective publications like Das Tierreich, Grossschmetterlinge der Erde, Nomenclator Animalium Generum and Subgenerum, Genera Insectorum and Catalogus Lepidopterum. He was a member of various entomological societies and received, in 1927, an honorary doctorate.

Works
Stichel, H.F.E.J. in Seitz, 1906 (Parnassius). Die Groß-Schmetterlinge der Erde. Die Groß-Schmetterlinge des palaearktischen Faunengebietes. Die palaearktischen Tagfalter, Stuttgart.
Stichel, H.F.E.J. Lepidoptera Rhopalocera. Fam. Riodinidae. J. Wytsman Genera Insectorum 112A 1-238. J. Wytsman Brussels.(1910–11).
Stichel, H.F.E.J. 1909 Vorarbeiten zu einer Revision der Riodinidae Grote (Erycinidae Swains.) Berl. ent. Z. 54 (1/2) : 1-48
Stichel, H.F.E.J. 1910 Vorarbeiten zu einer Revision der Riodinidae Grote (Erycinidae Swains.) (Lep. Rhop.) Berl. ent. Z. 55 (1/2) : 9-103
Stichel, H.F.E.J. 1911. Fam. Riodinidae. Allgemeines—Subfam. Riodininae. Genera Insectorum, 112 (B), 239–452.
Stichel, H.F.E.J. 1928 Die Veröffentlichungen über Erycinidae von A. Seitz im Spiegelbild der Kritik. (Lep. Rhopal.). Deutsche entomologische Zeitschrift, 1928 (2), 146–160.
Stichel,H.F.E.J. 1930 Riodinidae Lepidopterorum Catalogus 38: 1-112 (1930), 40: 113-544 (1930), 41: 545-720 (1930), 44: 721-795 (1931)

to be continued

1862 births
1936 deaths
People from Wronki
People from the Province of Posen
German lepidopterists